The Hegel Prize of the City of Stuttgart was first awarded in 1970 on the occasion of Georg Wilhelm Friedrich Hegel's 200th birthday. It is awarded every three years to a person who has made a contribution to the development of the humanities. The award is endowed with 12,000 euros. A jury decides on the award.

Recipients
Source:

 1970 Bruno Snell
 1973 Jürgen Habermas
 1976 Ernst Gombrich
 1979 Hans-Georg Gadamer
 1982 Roman Jacobson
 1985 Paul Ricœur
 1988 Niklas Luhmann
 1991 Donald Davidson
 1994 Jacques Le Goff
 1997 Charles Taylor
 2000 Norberto Bobbio
 2003 Dieter Henrich
 2006 Richard Sennett
 2009 Michael Tomasello
 2012 Gertrude Lübbe-Wolff
 2015  (posthum)
 2018 Michael Stolleis
 2021 Béatrice Longuenesse

References

External links
 

Georg Wilhelm Friedrich Hegel
Philosophy awards
Humanities awards
Awards established in 1970
Stuttgart